The  is a DC electric multiple unit (EMU) train type operated in Japan for limited express services by East Japan Railway Company (JR East) and built jointly by Hitachi, Kinki Sharyo, and Tokyu Car Corporation.

Variants
 E257-0 series: Azusa, Kaiji
 E257-500 series: Sazanami, Wakashio, Shiosai, Ayame
 E257-2000/-2500 series: Odoriko, Shōnan
E257-5000/-5500 series: additional services

Four variants exist: the original E257-0 series for use on Chūō Main Line Azusa and Kaiji limited-express services until 16 March 2019 (displaced by E353 series EMUs), the E257-500 series for use on Chiba area limited express services (Uchibo Line Sazanami, Sotobo Line Wakashio, Sōbu Main Line Shiosai, and Narita and Kashima Lines Ayame), the E257-2000/-2500 used for Odoriko services modified from former E257-0 and -500 series trains, and the E257-5000/5500 from former E257-0 and -500 trains for use on additional and charter services.

E257-0 series
This sub-series was introduced on 1 December 2001 to replace the aging 183 and 189 series rolling stock on Chuo Main Line Azusa and Kaiji services. Based at Matsumoto depot, the fleet consisted of sixteen 9-car sets (M101 to M116) with a full cab at the Matsumoto end and a gangwayed cab at the Tokyo end, and five 2-car "add-on" sets (M201 to M205) with a full cab at the Tokyo end and a shunting cab at the Matsumoto end.

The type was the recipient of the 45th Blue Ribbon Award (2002) of the Japan Railfan Club.

From 2018, the E257 series trains were replaced by E353 series EMUs on Chuo Main Line Azusa and Kaiji limited express services. From the start of the revised timetable on 16 March 2019, E257 series trains were no longer used on regular Chuo Main Line limited express services. The trains were modified into E257-2000 series trainsets and redeployed on Tokaido Main Line Odoriko services from 14 March 2020. Several sets are still under refurbishment and three sets which has been reserved to be used on charter and extra services were modified into E257-5000s.

Operations

Former operations
 Chūō Main Line, Shinonoi Line, and Oito Line
Azusa: Chiba - Tokyo - Shinjuku - Matsumoto - Minamiotari
Kaiji: Tokyo - Shinjuku - Kōfu - Ryūō
Chūō Liner: Tokyo - Shinjuku - Hachiōji - Takao (now replaced by Ltd. Express Hachioji)
Ōme Liner: : Tokyo - Shinjuku - Tachikawa - Ōme (now replaced by Ltd. Express Ōme)
Rapid service (no additional charge required): Matsumoto - Nagano

Matsumoto-based E257 series trains were also used on the Ohayo Liner Shinjuku and Home Liner Odawara commuter services running on the Tokaido Main Line until 14 March 2008.

Formations
The nine-car sets (M101 to M116) were formed as follows.

 Cars 4, 6, and 9 were each fitted with one PS37 single-arm pantograph.

The two-car sets (M201 to M205) were formed as follows.

 Car 2 is fitted with one PS37 single-arm pantograph.

Interior

E257-500 series

The E257-500 sub-series version was delivered between July 2004 and October 2005, with the first sets entering service from 16 October 2004 on Uchibo Line Sazanami and Sotobo Line Wakashio limited-express services, replacing older 183 series rolling stock. Based at Makuhari depot in Chiba Prefecture, the fleet consists of 19 5-car sets (NB01 to NB19). Unlike the Chūō Line variant, these sets have gangways at both ends.

Due to the reduction of the Chiba area limited express services, several trains are being used for the Chuo and Fujikyuko Line Fuji Excursion services and other charter and extra services. In addition to these, 4 sets are planned for conversion into E257-2500 to be used on Tōkaidō Main Line Odoriko limited express services, with further 5 sets to be converted to E257-5500 for use on additional services.

Formation
The five-car E257-500 series sets (NB01 to NB19) are formed as follows.

Cars 2 and 4 are each fitted with one PS37 single-arm pantograph.

Services operated
 Uchibo Line
 Sazanami: Tokyo - Tateyama
 Sotobo Line
 Wakashio: Tokyo - Katsuura - Awa-Kamogawa
 Sobu Main Line
Shiosai: (Shinjuku) - Tokyo - Chōshi
 Ayame (discontinued): Tokyo - Narita - Chōshi
 Yokosuka Line
Ohayo Liner Zushi (discontinued): Zushi - Tokyo
 Home Liner Zushi (discontinued): Tokyo - Zushi

Interior
The E257-500 series sets are mono-class, with standard-class accommodation only.

E257-2000/2500 series

The E257-2000 and -2500 series are refurbished versions of the E257-0 and -500 series respectively. The fleet consists of thirteen 9-car E257-2000 sets and four 5-car E257-2500 sets intended for Odoriko limited express services on the Tōkaidō Main Line.

The refurbishment was largely based on the "Peninsula Blue" concept, which is inspired by the colours of the sky and sea of the Izu Peninsula. Internally, the sets received several improvements, including toilets, increased luggage capacity, improved lighting, and new flooring.

The first E257-2000 set, converted from E257-0 set M112 at Nagano General Rolling Stock Centre, was delivered to Omiya in March 2019. On 14 March 2020, two round-trips of the formerly 185 series-operated Odoriko services were replaced by E257-2000s. Since 13 March 2021, these sets have been used across all Odoriko services, excluding the Saphir Odoriko. On 15 March of that year, the E257-2000/2500 series sets were introduced on the Shōnan limited express.

E257-5000/5500 series

Three E257-0 series sets and five -500 series sets were refurbished and designated as E257-5000 and -5500 series respectively for use on additional and charter services. The refurbishments saw a new front head, which is similar to the -2000/2500 series, and new green-accented livery. Interiors were much retained, with more luggage space and updated curtains. The first E257-5000 set, OM-91 (former M-105), first appeared in May 2021 and entered service on 12 August 2021.

From the start of JR East's 18 March 2023 timetable revision, E257-5500 series sets are scheduled to enter regular service on Kusatsu Shiman and Akagi limited express services on the Takasaki Line.

References

External links

 E257, Tokyu Car Corp
 E257-500, Kinki Sharyo
 E257, Hitachi Rail
 JR E257 Azusa/Kaiji 
 JR E257-500 Wakashio/Sazanami 

Electric multiple units of Japan
East Japan Railway Company
Hitachi multiple units
Tokyu Car multiple units
Kinki Sharyo multiple units
Train-related introductions in 2001
1500 V DC multiple units of Japan